The 2017 FIBA U18 Women's European Championship was an international basketball competition that was held from 5 to 13 August 2017 in Hungary. It was the 34rd edition of the championship. 16 national teams from across Europe, composed of women aged 18 and under, competed in the tournament.

Venues

Participating teams
 
   (Third place, 2016 FIBA U18 Women's European Championship Division B)
 
 
 
   (Runners-up, 2016 FIBA U18 Women's European Championship Division B)
  (Host)
 
  
 
 
 
 
   (Winners, 2016 FIBA U18 Women's European Championship Division B)

First round
The first-round groups draw took place on 10 December 2016 in Prague, Czech Republic. 

All times are local (UTC+2).

Group A

Group B

Group C

Group D

Knockout stage

Bracket

5th–8th place bracket

9th–16th place bracket

13th–16th place bracket

Round of 16

9th–16th place quarterfinals

Quarterfinals

13th–16th place semifinals

9th–12th place semifinals

5th–8th place semifinals

Semifinals

15th place game

13th place game

11th place game

9th place game

7th place game

5th place game

Bronze medal game

Final

Final standings

Awards

All-Tournament Team
  Klara Lundquist
  Ivana Katanić
  Kadiatou Sissoko
  Veronika Voráčková
   Billie Massey

References

External links
FIBA official website

2017
2017–18 in European women's basketball
2017–18 in Hungarian basketball
International youth basketball competitions hosted by Hungary
International women's basketball competitions hosted by Hungary
Sport in Sopron
2017 in youth sport
FIBA